William Wallace (died 1305) was a Scottish knight, landowner, and leader during the Wars of Scottish Independence.

William Wallace may also refer to:

Europeans
Willie Wallace (born 1940), Scottish footballer
William Wallace (footballer, born 1893) (1893–1917), English footballer
William Wallace of Failford (d. 1616) Scottish courtier
William Wallace (mason) (died 1631), Scottish master mason and architect
William Vincent Wallace (1812–1865), Irish composer
William Wallace (philosopher) (1844–1897), Scottish philosopher
William Wallace (Scottish composer) (1860–1940), Scottish classical composer
William Wallace (Jesuit) (1863–1922), Irish Jesuit priest and Indologist
William Wallace, Baron Wallace of Saltaire (born 1941), British academic, writer and politician
William Wallace, real name of Ali Bongo (1929–2009), British comedy magician
Staker Wallace (1733–1798), United Irishman, sometimes referred to as William
William Herbert Wallace (1878–1933), English convicted 'murderer', later found to be innocent on appeal
William Kelly Wallace (1883–1969), Irish railway engineer
William Middleton Wallace (1892–1915), Scotland rugby player
William Wallace (mathematician) (1768–1843), Scottish mathematician
William Wallace (chemist) (1832–1888), Scottish chemist and city analyst for Glasgow
Sir William Wallace (marine engineer) (1881–1963), inventor of naval technology and Scottish businessman

Americans
William Wallace Lincoln (1850–1862), son of Abraham Lincoln
William A. A. Wallace (1817–1899), Texas Ranger captain with the nickname "Bigfoot"
William A. Wallace (organizational theorist) (born 1935), Professor at Rensselaer Polytechnic Institute
William A. Wallace (1827–1896), U.S. Senator from Pennsylvania
William C. Wallace (1856–1901), U.S. Representative from New York.
William E. Wallace (1917–2004), known as Ed Wallace to his friends and associates, physical chemist
William H. Wallace (1811–1879), first territorial governor and Congressional delegate from Idaho Territory
William Henry Wallace (1827–1901), Confederate general and South Carolina state legislator
W. H. L. Wallace (1821–1862), Union general in the American Civil War
William J. Wallace (Indianapolis mayor)
William A. Wallace (Illinois politician), Illinois state representative
William J. Wallace (USMC) (1895–1977), American Marine Corps aviation officer
William James Wallace (1837–1917), lawyer and federal judge in the United States
William M. Wallace (1911–2000), American historian
William Miller Wallace (1844–1924), U.S. Army general
William O. Wallace (1906–1968), Hollywood set decorator
William Robert Wallace (1886–1960), American judge
William Ross Wallace (1819–1881), American poet
William S. Wallace (born 1946), General in the United States Army
William T. Wallace (1828–1909), Chief Justice of the Supreme Court of California and an Attorney General of California
William A. Wallace, historian, philosopher, and River Forest Thomist
Bill Wallace (American football) (1912–1993), American football player
Bill Wallace (martial artist) (born 1945), kickboxer

Canadians
William Wallace (Canadian politician) (1820–1887), Scottish-born merchant and politician in Ontario
William Tracy Wallace (1880–1947), Canadian-born artist in England
William Stewart Wallace (1884–1970), historian, librarian, and editor
William Wallace (rower) (1901–1967), Olympic rower
Bill Wallace (musician) (born 1949), musician

New Zealanders
Billy Wallace (1878–1972), New Zealand rugby union player
William Wallace (born 1971), actor, appeared in The Cult and Step Dave

South Americans
William Wallace (Brazilian footballer) (born 2002), Brazilian footballer

See also

Sir William Wallace Hotel, a historic pub in the suburb of Balmain, New South Wales, Australia
William Wallis (disambiguation)
Bill Wallace (disambiguation)